Motu Hakamaru is one of 43 islands in the Manihiki atoll of the Cook Islands. It is a small islet and marks the south-eastern corner of the atoll.

References

Manihiki